Gabby Duran & the Unsittables is an American sci-fi comedy television series created by Mike Alber and Gabe Snyder that aired on Disney Channel from October 11, 2019 to November 26, 2021. Based on the novel Gabby Duran and the Unsittables by Elise Allen and Daryle Conners, the series stars Kylie Cantrall, Maxwell Acee Donovan, Callan Farris, Coco Christo, Valery Ortiz, and Nathan Lovejoy.

Premise 
After living in the shadows of her successful mother Dina and smart younger sister Olivia even when they move to Havensburg, Colorado, Gabby Duran finds her moment to shine when she gets a job from Principal Swift to babysit an unruly group of extraterrestrial children who have been hiding out on Earth disguised as humans. Gabby resourcefully and fearlessly steps up to the challenge to protect the children and their secret identities.

Cast and characters

Main 
 Kylie Cantrall as Gabby Duran, a resourceful and courageous 13-year-old girl who finally gets her moment to shine after landing a job to babysit extraterrestrial children.
 Maxwell Acee Donovan as Wesley, Gabby's best friend and a conspiracy theorist. In "Wesley and the Fischman", he finds out about Gabby's babysitting job. In "Tailoring Swift," it is revealed that Wesley is allergic to wool. In "Beware the Fright Master!", it is revealed that Wesley originally took up the Fright Master identity back in 4th grade to scare his gym teacher. In "Extreme Ruckus", it is revealed that his last name is Presley.
 Callan Farris as Jeremy, a shape-shifting blob alien called a Gor-Mon from the planet Gor-Monia and Gabby's first babysitting assignment who is the heir to the Gor-Monite throne. In the episode "Enter the Dranis," it is revealed that Jeremy's real name is Franis and has begun to see Julius as a friend. Farris also voices Jeremy's Gor-Mon form.
 Coco Christo as Olivia, Gabby's overachieving younger sister. She finds out about Gabby's babysitting job around "Wesley Jr." and "The Note" where she considered the aliens dangerous until she met Jeremy.
 Valery Ortiz as Dina, Gabby's caring and career-driven mother who works as a news reporter at Channel 6.
 Nathan Lovejoy as Principal Swift, the principal of Havensburg Junior High, a Gor-Mon, and the uncle of Jeremy who enlists Gabby to babysit Jeremy and other alien children. In the episode "Enter the Dranis," it is revealed that his real name is Granis and is the brother of Gor-Monia's Supreme Leader who he has a poor relationship with. Lovejoy also voices Swift's Gor-Mon form.

Recurring 
 Laara Sadiq as Orb, a Gor-Monite Technological Orb that works for Principal Swift and keeps an eye on Jeremy when Principal Swift is occupied
 Kheon Clarke as Julius, a waiter at Luchachos
 Elle McKinnon as Sky, a telepathic alien girl who becomes Gabby's friend
 Brent Clark as Sky's Dad, the unnamed father of Sky
 Ricardo Ortiz as Jace, a charitable but oblivious boy who is Gabby's former love interest
 Mia Bella as Kali, a warrior alien girl from a war-ridden planet
 Bracken Hanke as Susie, Gabby's rival and a neighborhood babysitter who takes her job very seriously
 Alex Rose as Glor-Bron, a boastful Gor-Monite who is Principal Swift's rival. Rose also voices his Gor-Monite form.	
 Jeremy Davis as Howard, a student at Havensburg Junior High who is the best basketball player
 Ryan Beil as Blurt, a Blorg alien who is the proprietor of an underground alien pawn shop called Blurt's

Production 
On August 3, 2018, Disney Channel green-lit the sci-fi comedy series as a straight-to-series order, with production underway in Vancouver, Canada, for a 2019 premiere. Kirby Buckets Mike Alber and Gabe Snyder serve as showrunners and executive producers. Just Add Magics Joe Nussbaum also serves as executive producer. Grey's Anatomys Nzingha Stewart directed the first episode. On August 2, 2019, it was revealed that the series would premiere in October 2019. On August 29, 2019, Disney Channel announced an exact premiere date of October 11, 2019. The series is a production of Gabby Productions, Ltd. On October 7, 2019, it was announced that Disney Channel renewed the series for a second season ahead of its series premiere. On April 29, 2021, it was announced that the second season would premiere on June 4, 2021. On December 6, 2021, it was announced that the series was canceled after two seasons.

Episodes

Series overview
<onlyinclude>

Season 1 (2019–20)

Season 2 (2021)

Ratings 
 

| link2             = #Season 2 (2021)
| episodes2         = 20
| start2            = 
| end2              = 
| startrating2      = 0.32
| endrating2        = 0.27
| viewers2          = |2}}  
}}

References

External links 
 

2010s American children's comedy television series
2010s American comic science fiction television series
2020s American children's comedy television series
2020s American comic science fiction television series
2019 American television series debuts
2021 American television series endings
Disney Channel original programming
English-language television shows
Television shows set in Colorado
Television series by Disney